The Constitution of Queensland is the constitution of the Australian state of Queensland. As with the other constitutions of Australian states and territories, it is a written constitution influenced by the Westminster system and Australia's federal system of government. It defines Queensland as a state under a constitutional monarchy and outlines the structure and powers of the Queensland government's three constituent parts, the executive, legislature, and judiciary.

In 1901, the six Australian colonies, including Queensland, federated to form Commonwealth of Australia which is constituted by the Australian Constitution. From that time onward, Queensland ceded the power to make laws relating to certain matters to the federal government. Outside these sections however, state parliament retains  absolute legislative power.

Function
The Constitution establishes the government of Queensland and defines the structure, powers and function of the three branches of government:
 Legislature: the unicameral Parliament of Queensland, comprising the Legislative Assembly and the Monarch (represented by the Governor);
 Executive: the Executive Council of Queensland, which formalises decisions of the Cabinet of Queensland, which is composed of the Premier and other ministers of state appointed by the Governor on the advice of Parliament;
 Judiciary: the Supreme Court and other state courts, whose judges are appointed by the Governor on advice of Parliament.
The constitution also defines the role of the governor. Under the constitution, governmental authority is nominally vested in the Governor of Queensland (currently Jeannette Young) on behalf of the Crown and who is appointed by the Monarch (currently Charles III) on the advice of the Premier of Queensland. The governor's role is mostly ceremonial, however they serve constitutional roles such as, presiding over meetings of the Executive Council, summoning, proroguing and dissolving Parliament on the advice of the Premier, giving Royal Assent to Bills passed by the Parliament, appointing all ministers of state, appointing and removing officials on the advice of the Executive Council, issuing writs for Queensland State Elections and for the election of Queensland representatives in the Australian Senate, on the advice of the Executive Council and granting pardons or commutations.

History
The current constitution is the Constitution of Queensland 2001. It is the state's second constitution, consolidating various constitutional provisions dating back to the 19th century, and in particular the state's first constitution, the Constitution Act 1867.

Entrenchment and amendments
The constitution contains entrenched provisions which can only be amended by way of referendum. It also contains provisions which may be amended by legislation.

Bill of rights
Queensland has a statutory bill of rights, the Human Rights Act 2019. This provides protections for 23 human rights, including freedom of expression, religion and privacy, and a right to education and health.

Complaints of violations of human rights can be taken to the Queensland Human Rights Commission.

The Act does not stop parliament from passing legislation that is incompatible with human rights but they must consider human rights when drafting laws, and prepare a Statement of compatibility.

References

Queensland
Queensland